Golgol Mebrahtu (born 28 August 1990) is an Eritrean-Australian professional football player who plays as a forward for NPL Victoria club Avondale.

Early life
Mebrahtu is of Eritrean origin. Born in the capital of the African country of Sudan, Mebrahtu moved to Brisbane, Queensland, Australia aged nine as a refugee during the Eritrean–Ethiopian War in 1999.

Club career

Gold Coast United
In June 2009, Mebrahtu signed a 3-year contract with Gold Coast United, after a successful trial at the club in April.

He was discovered by Gold Coast coach Miron Bleiberg, while he was waiting for a helicopter to take him from Brisbane to the Gold Coast. Bleiberg spotted Mebrahtu training by himself and recognised him from a previous scouting mission.

Melbourne Heart
For the 2012–13 season Mebrahtu played for Melbourne Heart. He wore the number 14
football jersey. In his first game for Melbourne Heart, he scored the winning goal in the 88th minute against Perth Glory. On 1 January 2013 he scored the first goal of that year.

On 2 February 2014 he was released from Melbourne Heart, 3 days before the end of the transfer window.

Western Sydney Wanderers
On 3 February 2014, Mebrahtu signed with the Western Sydney Wanderers along with Daniel Mullen. However, since there were no spaces remaining in the club's A-League squad, he was only eligible to participate in the Western Sydney Wanderers' 2014 AFC Champions League campaign during the 2013–14 season. On 5 March 2014, following a long-term injury to Tahj Minniecon, Mebrahtu was added to Western Sydney Wanderers' A-League squad. Mebrahtu made his debut for the Wanderers against Sydney FC as a substitute in the 71st minute, but was replaced 6 minutes later when injured in a tackle by Sydney FC midfielder Richard Garcia.

On 5 May 2016, Mebrahtu was released by the Western Sydney Wanderers.

Mladá Boleslav
In mid-2016, Mebrahtu joined Czech First League club Mladá Boleslav in the Czech Republic. He scored 6 goals in 14 matches in the 2017–18 season, but fell out of the matchday squad after the arrival of new Mladá Boleslav head coach Jozef Weber and Mebrahtu's contract was mutually terminated in August 2018.

Sparta Prague 
On 20 August 2018, it was announced he had signed a one-year contract with Sparta Prague and left the club at the end of the season.

Brisbane Roar 
On the 22nd January 2021 it was announced that Mebrahtu had signed a deal with Brisbane Roar. He scored his first goal for the club on March 21st, a late equaliser in a 1-1 draw against Wellington Phoenix.

PSM Makassar 
On 11 January 2022, Indonesian top flight side PSM Makassar announced it had signed Mebrahtu.

International career
Mebrahtu made his international debut for Australia's under-23 squad in 2011, coming on in the second half of in a loss to Japan U23.

Because of his birthplace and ancestry, Mebrahtu is eligible to represent multiple teams internationally: Australia, the country he is now a naturalised citizen of and gained the status of professional footballer in, Sudan, the country of his birth, and, Eritrea, the country of his ancestry.

Mebrahtu was approached by Daniel Solomon, an agent from the Eritrean National Football Federation, to play for Eritrea, the land of his ancestry, in August 2018.

He was called up to the Eritrean team for a World Cup qualifying playoff against Namibia in September 2019, but did not feature in the matchday squads.

Honours

Club
Gold Coast United
 National Youth League: 2009–10
Western Sydney Wanderers
 AFC Champions League: 2014

References

External links
 

1990 births
Living people
Australian soccer players
Eritrean footballers
A-League Men players
Czech First League players
Nemzeti Bajnokság I players
Liga 1 (Indonesia) players
Brisbane Strikers FC players
Gold Coast United FC players
Melbourne City FC players
Western Sydney Wanderers FC players
FK Mladá Boleslav players
AC Sparta Prague players
Puskás Akadémia FC players
Brisbane Roar FC players
PSM Makassar players
Eritrean emigrants to Australia
Child refugees
People educated at Brisbane State High School
Australian people of Eritrean descent
Australian expatriate soccer players
Association football forwards
Expatriate footballers in the Czech Republic
Expatriate footballers in Hungary
Expatriate footballers in Indonesia
Australian expatriate sportspeople in the Czech Republic
Australian expatriate sportspeople in Hungary
Australian expatriate sportspeople in Indonesia